Thomas Damuseau (born 18 March 1989) is a French former professional road racing cyclist, who rode professionally between 2011 and 2015 for the  and  teams.

Major results
Sources:

2009
 4th Overall Ronde de l'Isard
2010
 2nd Road race, National Road Championships
 4th Liège–Bastogne–Liège U23
 7th Overall Giro delle Regioni
2013
 1st  Mountains classification Critérium du Dauphiné
 3rd Grand Prix d'Ouverture La Marseillaise
 10th Paris–Bourges
2015
 5th Paris–Troyes
 7th Overall Boucles de la Mayenne

References

External links

Argos-Shimano: Thomas Damuseau
Cycling Base: Thomas Damuseau

1989 births
Living people
French male cyclists
Sportspeople from Grenoble
Université Savoie-Mont Blanc alumni
Cyclists from Auvergne-Rhône-Alpes